The Government of the Republic of Kenya (GoK) is the national government of the republic of Kenya which is composed of  47 Counties, each county with its own semi-autonomous governments. The national government is composed of three arms: The Legislature, the Executive and the Judiciary. Each arm is independent of the other and their individual roles are set by the Constitution of Kenya.
The full name of the country is the "Republic of Kenya". Its official Swahili name is 'Jamhuri ya Kenya'. Other terms such as GoK, GK and Serikali are popularly used to refer to the Kenyan government.

History
The government was formed in 1963. However, Kenya didn't become a republic until 1964. Initially, the head of government was the Prime Minister who was Jomo Kenyatta. He later on became the first President of Kenya.

The current structure of government allows power to be held on two levels: The national level and the county level . This allows the Counties of Kenya a form of autonomy. Before the 2013 elections Kenya was under a central government with eight provinces:
 Central
 Coast
 Eastern
 Nairobi
 North Eastern
 Nyanza
 Rift Valley
 Western

The country is a representative democracy legislatively, and a direct democracy in the election of its president, who is leader of the Executive branch of government. The current president of the Republic of Kenya is Ruto Samoei William. Kenya's constitution states that it is a multi-party democratic state founded on the national values and principles of governance referred to in Article 10.

There are three arms of government, which operate independently and work to balance each other, based upon the "Separation of powers" principle. Before the 2013 general election the Judiciary wouldn't be considered as independent as it is today, and before the 1992 elections Kenya wasn't a multiparty state - all power was centered in the Executive with Daniel Arap Moi as President.

Kenya

The Legislative 
The legislative branch includes the National Assembly and the Senate.
The legislature makes the laws
The legislature has the following functions:
1.Representing the electorate
2.Making and amending laws 
3.Checking and approving government expenses 
4.Debating motions that affect the electorate

The Executive
The Executive is charged with enforcing the law. The executive branch consists of the President, the Deputy President and the Cabinet. Cabinet meetings are held with the Attorney General present.

President

The President is the head of state and government, as in most republics. He is also the Commander-in-chief of the Kenya Defence Forces.

The President has the power to appoint every leader within the executive including Cabinet Secretaries and the Attorney General.

The incumbent is William Ruto. Kenya has had 5 presidents. The longest serving president was Daniel arap Moi who served for 24 years.

The National Assembly with at least a third of all the members, may set in motion an act to impeach the President. The National Assembly may do so on the grounds of gross violation of the Constitution or any other law, where there is reasons to believing that the President has committed a crime under national or international law or for gross misconduct.

If the motion to impeach passes in the National Assembly the act to impeach moves to the Senate and if at least two-thirds of all the members of the Senate vote to uphold any impeachment charge, the President shall cease to hold office.

Deputy President

The Deputy President is the second-highest executive office in the republic. The position before the 2013 general election was known as the Vice-President of Kenya. There have been 12 deputy presidents since independence.

The incumbent is Rigathi Gachagua who as William Ruto is part of the Kenya Kwanza. The first person to hold the position was Jaramogi Oginga Odinga. The 8th person to hold the office, Michael Kijana Wamalwa was the first and only person to pass away while in office. George Saitoti has held the position twice on separate occasions.

The Deputy President's functions are to be the main assistant to the President and shall deputise for the President in the execution of the President's functions. He must be qualified to become president in order to take the office as he is first in line in the order of  presidential succession.

The Deputy President as the president is limited to two terms in office.

The coat of arms of Kenya

The Government is run by the Ministries of Kenya. The constitution limits the number of Ministries to a minimum of 14 and maximum of 22. The headings of the ministries are known as Cabinet Secretaries who are all nominated by the President. The President has power to assign and dismiss a Cabinet Secretary.

A Cabinet Secretary cannot be an MP and their deputies are known as Principal Secretaries.

All civil servants e.g. teachers in public schools or diplomats fall under one of the ministries in the Cabinet.

The Judiciary

The Judiciary is charged with applying and upholding the law. This is done through a legal system consisting of courts.

The Court System

The Judiciary is led by the Chief Justice. The Chief Justice sits at the Supreme Court whose court decisions are binding to all courts. The current Chief Justice is Chief Justice Martha Koome who is the fifteenth person to hold the office.

The courts are divided into two levels: Superior Courts and Subordinate Courts. Superior Courts are the higher courts and are presided over by Judges. These are the Supreme Court, the Court of Appeal, the High Court which hears almost every type of case., the Environment and Land Court and the Industrial Court.

The subordinate courts consist of the Magistrates courts, the Kadhi courts, the Courts Martial and any other court or local tribunal as may be established by an Act of Parliament, other than the currently established courts.

All Judges, including the Chief Justice and the Deputy Chief Justice, are selected by the Judicial Service Commission  but are officially appointed by the President. However, the persons selected to be the Chief Justice and Deputy Chief Justice must first be vetted by Parliament before being appointed by the President. All other Judges do not need Parliamentary vetting and approval. Magistrates who preside over the subordinate courts are selected and appointed by the Judicial Service Commission without the involvement of the President or Parliament.

Elections and voting

Elections in Kenya that predate 1992 were not multiparty elections. On independence, Kenya voted for Kenyatta as President. However, over the next few years Kenya slowly transitioned from being a democracy to being a one-party state. Kenyatta's regime greatly oversaw the gradual limitation of the democratic system. Kenyatta died in 1978; his vice President Moi took over and in 1982 the country was officially made a one-party state with every other party being outlawed. This was met by resistance over the next decade or so. In 1992 Kenya's first multiparty elections were held.

Ever since then elections have been held every 5 years. In 2013 the general election paved the way for semi-autonomy of the 47 counties of Kenya. Uhuru Kenyatta, the fourth president won and his coalition the Jubilee Alliance controlled the majority in both houses of Parliament, i.e. the National Assembly and the Senate.

The incumbent president William Ruto won the 2022 general elections and his coalition Kenya Kwanza now controls the majority in both houses of Parliament, i.e. the National Assembly and the Senate.

The state allows universal suffrage based on the aspiration for fair representation and equality. The only people not allowed to vote are people convicted of an election offence during the preceding five years. Elections in Kenya are overseen by the Independent Electoral and Boundaries Commission.

County governments

The Counties of Kenya have devolved functions of the former central government. Each county has its own Governor who is directly elected and thereafter becomes the  highest elected official in the county. Each county has its own County Assembly with MCAs (Members of the County Assembly ) as representatives.

The powers of the County are provided in Articles 191 and 192, and in the Fourth Schedule of the Constitution of Kenya and the County Governments Act of 2012.

Functions and duties not assigned by the Constitution automatically become the National governments responsibility.

As opposed to other devolved governments around the world, only the national government may impose income tax, value-added tax, customs duties and other duties on import and export goods and excise tax.

The counties are individually allowed to impose property rates, entertainment taxes and any other tax that it is authorised to impose by an Act of Parliament.

See also
 President
 The Cabinet
 The Judiciary
 The Supreme Court

 Law
 The Constitution

 Counties
 Counties

References

External links

 myGov , the official GoK portal.
 OpenData Kenya, Government Stats | Open Data Initiative
 The Presidency, The Presidency | GoK

 
1963 establishments in Kenya